Jean Bart is the name given to the replica of a 1670, 84-gun, ship-of-the-line, that is being constructed by the Association Tourville at Gravelines, Dunkirk, to the plans of the seventeenth century ship builder Colbert. It has European funding through the Heroes2c programme.

Jean Bart, the corsaire
Jean Bart was a native of Dunkirk (Dunkerque).

The project
The project is being managed by the Association Tourville. The keel of the ship was laid down in 2002, and it expected that it will take 20 years to complete. It uses traditional seventeenth century open air ship building techniques and it is hoped to preserve these skills for another generation. The ship is being built next to the Basin Vauban, in Gravelines, France.

From 2010 to 2013 it had the support of the European Development Fund's Interreg IV, Heroes2c scheme.

See also
Medway Queen, also funded by Heroes2c
New Belgica, also funded by Heroes2c
Hermione (2014), reproduction of the 1779 Hermione.

References

External links
Association Tourville's website 

Museum ships in France
Heroes2c
Ships built in France